Long Ju (died 204 BC) was a military general who served under the warlord Xiang Yu during the Chu–Han Contention.

Life
Long Ju was a childhood friend of Xiang Yu and they were said to be as close as brothers. When Xiang Liang (Xiang Yu's uncle) rebelled against the Qin dynasty around 208 BC, Long Ju followed the Xiangs on military campaigns against Qin forces. He distinguished himself as a valiant warrior on the battlefield and earned the trust and respect of Xiang Yu.

Following the fall of the Qin dynasty in 206 BC, Xiang Yu proclaimed himself "Hegemon-King of Western Chu" and appointed Long Ju as his grand marshal. Long Ju fought on the Chu side in the Chu–Han Contention against Xiang Yu's rival, Liu Bang. After his victory at the Battle of Pengcheng in 205 BC, Xiang Yu put Long Ju in command of his elite cavalry unit composed of hired Xiongnu warriors.

When Ying Bu betrayed Xiang Yu and defected to Liu Bang's side, Xiang Yu sent Long Ju to attack Ying Bu. Long Ju scored a major victory over Ying Bu in Jiujiang and destroyed most of Ying's army. Ying Bu barely managed to escape under the protection of his bodyguards and went to join Liu Bang.

In 204 BC, Liu Bang's army on the northern front, led by Han Xin, attacked the Qi kingdom. Xiang Yu felt that Han Xin posed a great threat to him and sent Long Ju to lead an army to help Qi. The allied force of Qi and Chu was said to be 200,000 strong. During the Battle of Wei River, Han Xin feigned defeat and lured Long Ju to follow him. Long Ju underestimated the enemy and led very few men on pursuit and fell into a trap. Han Xin ordered his men to open the dam and release the river to flood the Chu army, separating Long Ju's small group from his main army behind. The Chu army was thrown into confusion and Long Ju was surrounded by the enemy. Despite fighting for his life, Long Ju was eventually outnumbered and killed in battle by Guan Ying's soldiers.

References
 Sima Qian. Records of the Grand Historian, Volume 95.

204 BC deaths
Chu–Han contention people
Year of birth unknown